Collingwood Children's Farm is a not-for-profit, inner city working farm situated on the Yarra River in the Melbourne suburb of Abbotsford, Australia. It is located within Wurundjeri/Woiwurrung country. It is adjacent to the Abbotsford Convent, and considered part of the larger Abbotsford Heritage Precinct Farmlands (APHF). The APHF supporting the Collingwood Children's Farm are unique in being the oldest continually farmed land in the state of Victoria. European farming commenced in early 1836, with formal land sales occurring in 1838. Farming on the APHF has continued uninterrupted from its agricultural use by Wurundjeri/Woiwurrung to grow crops such as Murnong (Microseris lanceolata). It is also the oldest children's farm in Australia, established in 1979.

To celebrate the Winter Solstice and as a fundraiser, the farm also holds an annual bonfire event.

The farm has a range of animals including cows, goats, sheep, horses, ducks, pigs, chickens, geese, peacocks and guinea pigs. Nearly all of the animals at the farm are classified as rare breeds.

The farm began in 1979, when a community committee leased a small plot of Crown land next to the Yarra River, used by the farm and community gardeners. Funding has come from various sources over the years and now entrance fees and donations make up the bulk of the farm's income. The farm relies on community effort with staff, volunteers and a young farmers' program working to maintain the farm.

The Yarra River Trail passes through the farm.

See also
CERES Community Environment Park

References

External links

Official website
The Farm Cafe website
Feature on Mind Body & Soul

Tourist attractions in Victoria (Australia)
1979 establishments in Australia
Farms in Australia
Entertainment venues in Victoria (Australia)
Buildings and structures in the City of Yarra